Bartłomiej Matysiak (born 11 September 1984) is a Polish former professional racing cyclist, who rode professionally between 2007 and 2017.

Major results

2005
 8th Memoriał Andrzeja Trochanowskiego
2006
 1st Overall Bałtyk–Karkonosze Tour
1st Stage 2
 3rd Memoriał Henryka Łasaka
 9th Overall FBD Insurance Rás
1st Stage 8
2007
 8th Poreč Trophy
 10th Memoriał Andrzeja Trochanowskiego
2008
 1st Puchar Ministra Obrony Narodowej
 2nd Road race, National Road Championships
 8th Memoriał Andrzeja Trochanowskiego
 10th Overall Dookoła Mazowsza
2009
 2nd Overall Tour du Maroc
 5th Overall Szlakiem Grodów Piastowskich
 5th Overall Course de la Solidarité Olympique
1st Stage 6
 10th Puchar Ministra Obrony Narodowej
2010
 1st Puchar Ministra Obrony Narodowej
2011
 5th Clásica de Almería
 9th Gran Premio Nobili Rubinetterie
2012
 10th Puchar Ministra Obrony Narodowej
2013
 1st Puchar Ministra Obrony Narodowej
 1st Mountains classification Szlakiem Grodów Piastowskich
 4th Overall Tour of Estonia
1st Stage 3
 4th Memoriał Andrzeja Trochanowskiego
 6th Gran Premio Bruno Beghelli
 7th Clásica de Almería
2014
 1st  Road race, National Road Championships
 2nd Overall Memorial Grundmanna I Wizowskiego
1st Stage 1
 5th Overall Tour of Małopolska
1st Stage 1
 7th Clásica de Almería
 9th Eschborn-Frankfurt – Rund um den Finanzplatz
2015
 5th Trofej Umag
 5th Poreč Trophy
2016
 3rd Puchar Ministra Obrony Narodowej
 7th Visegrad 4 Bicycle Race – GP Czech Republic
 9th Eschborn-Frankfurt – Rund um den Finanzplatz

References

External links

1984 births
Living people
Polish male cyclists
Place of birth missing (living people)
European Games competitors for Poland
Cyclists at the 2015 European Games